Patriarch Gabriel may refer to:

 Gabriel I of Constantinople, Ecumenical Patriarch of Constantinople in 1596
 Gabriel II of Constantinople, Ecumenical Patriarch of Constantinople in 1657
 Gabriel III of Constantinople, Ecumenical Patriarch of Constantinople in 1702–1707
 Gabriel IV of Constantinople, Ecumenical Patriarch of Constantinople in 1780–1785
 Pope Gabriel I of Alexandria, Pope of Alexandria & Patriarch of the See of St. Mark in 910–920/1
 Pope Gabriel II of Alexandria, Pope of Alexandria & Patriarch of the See of St. Mark in 1131–1145
 Pope Gabriel III of Alexandria, Pope of Alexandria & Patriarch of the See of St. Mark in 1268–1271
 Pope Gabriel IV of Alexandria, Pope of Alexandria & Patriarch of the See of St. Mark in 1370–1378
 Pope Gabriel V of Alexandria, Pope of Alexandria & Patriarch of the See of St. Mark in 1408–1427
 Pope Gabriel VI of Alexandria, Pope of Alexandria & Patriarch of the See of St. Mark in 1466–1475
 Pope Gabriel VII of Alexandria, Pope of Alexandria & Patriarch of the See of St. Mark in 1525–1570
 Pope Gabriel VIII of Alexandria, Pope of Alexandria & Patriarch of the See of St. Mark in 1587–1603
 Pope Gabriel of Blaouza, Maronite Patriarch in 1704–1705

See also 
 Patriarch Gavrilo (disambiguation)